Schive Chi (born 28 June 1947) is a Taiwanese politician. He was the Governor of Fujian Province from 30 September 2013 to 11 March 2014.

Education
Chi obtained his bachelor's and master's degree in economics from National Taiwan University in 1969 and 1972 respectively. He then obtained his doctoral degree in the same degree from Case Western Reserve University from the United States in 1978.

Early career
Chi was the chairman of the Taiwan Stock Exchange before being named a minister. He had previously led the Council of Economic Planning and Development, Taiwan Academy of Banking and Finance, and the Department of Economics at the National Taiwan University.

References

Political office-holders in the Republic of China on Taiwan
Living people
1947 births
Case Western Reserve University alumni
National Taiwan University alumni
Ohio University faculty
Academic staff of the National Central University
Academic staff of the National Taiwan University
Academic staff of the Free University of Berlin
Taiwanese people from Chongqing